DR Congo is one of major participant in Africa Cup of Nations, having participated in nineteen editions of all AFCON tournaments. They are also one of the most successful teams in Africa, having won the titles twice in 1968 as Congo-Kinshasa and 1974 as Zaire. However, since then, successes have been elusively fading for the national side of DR Congo, in spite of their frequent participation in the tournament aftermath. Their best result since 1974 was third place in 1998 and 2015.

Competitive records

Matches

Squads

References

External links
Africa Cup of Nations - Archives competitions - cafonline.com

Democratic Republic of the Congo national football team
Countries at the Africa Cup of Nations